Dennis Ravindran Chanmugam (born 13 August 1948) is a former cricketer who played first-class cricket for Sri Lanka from 1973 to 1975.

Dennis Chanmugam attended S. Thomas' College, Mount Lavinia, captaining the cricket team in 1967–68. An opening bowler, he played most of his first-class cricket for Sri Lanka on three tours: to Pakistan in 1973-74, to England in 1975 for the World Cup, and to India in 1975-76. Apart from one match against Pakistan in 1973-74 he did not play in the international matches on these tours. His best first-class figures were 3 for 32 and 4 for 60 against Pakistan Universities at Rawalpindi.

In September 2018, he was one of 49 former Sri Lankan cricketers felicitated by Sri Lanka Cricket, to honour them for their services before Sri Lanka became a full member of the International Cricket Council (ICC).

His elder brother Neil Chanmugam played for Sri Lanka between 1960 and 1974.

References

External links

1948 births
Living people
Sri Lankan cricketers
Alumni of S. Thomas' College, Mount Lavinia
Cricketers from Colombo